Peter Scott (born 24 March 1931) is a former  Australian rules footballer who played with Hawthorn in the Victorian Football League (VFL).

Scott was recruited form University Blacks and played the first two games of the 1950 season. After two games in which Hawthorn were badly beaten, first by Geelong and then St. Kilda, Scott realised that he was not up to the VFL standard required and he retired as a nineteen year old.

Notes

External links 

Living people
1931 births
Australian rules footballers from Victoria (Australia)
Hawthorn Football Club players
University Blacks Football Club players